Veljko Petković may refer to:

Veljko Petković (volleyball) (born 1977), Serbian volleyball player
Veljko Petković (footballer) (born 2000), Serbian footballer